Stylidium fimbriatum is a dicotyledonous plant that belongs to the genus Stylidium (family Stylidiaceae). It is an erect annual plant that grows from 15 to 30 cm tall. Oblanceolate leaves, about 16 per plant, form a basal rosette around the compressed stems. The leaves are generally 5–20 mm long and 2–7 mm wide. This species generally has one or two scapes and cymose inflorescences that are 15–30 cm long. Flowers are pink with yellow highlights. S. fimbriatum's distribution is confined to the area around Bachsten Creek in the Kimberley region in Western Australia. Its typical habitat is herbfields that are seasonally wet.

See also 
 List of Stylidium species

References 

Carnivorous plants of Australia
Eudicots of Western Australia
fimbriatum
Asterales of Australia